The Czenakowski distance (sometimes shortened as CZD) is a per-pixel quality metric that estimates quality or similarity by measuring differences between pixels. Because it compares vectors with strictly non-negative elements, it is often used to compare colored images, as color values cannot be negative. This different approach has a better correlation with subjective quality assessment than PSNR.

Definition 
Androutsos et al. give the Czenakowski coefficient as follows:

Where a pixel  is being compared to a pixel  on the k-th band of color – usually one for each of red, green and blue.

For a pixel matrix of size , the Czenakowski coefficient can be used in an arithmetic mean spanning all pixels to calculate the Czenakowski distance as follows:

Where  is the (i, j)-th pixel of the k-th band of a color image and, similarly,  is the pixel that it is being compared to.

Uses 
In the context of image forensics – for example, detecting if an image has been manipulated –, Rocha et al. report the Czenakowski distance is a popular choice for Color Filter Array (CFA) identification.

References 

Computer graphics